HSwMS Göteborg (K21) is a Swedish Navy , named after the Swedish city of Göteborg.

Development and design 
The Göteborg class is a class of corvettes in the Swedish Navy, built between 1986 and 1993. The class was originally designed to destroy Soviet submarines and surface vessels, and is armed with eight RBS-15 anti-ship missiles, torpedoes, one 57 mm cannon and one 40 mm cannon.

HSwMS Sundsvall and HSwMS Gävle will receive modification in 2019–2020. After the modification the corvettes will be named Gävle class.

Construction and career 
The ship was launched on 13 April 1989 at Karlskrona and entered naval service on 15 February 1990.

References 

Göteborg-class corvettes
Corvettes of Sweden
1989 ships
Ships built in Sweden